Reginar IV, Count of Mons, in Hainaut, (c. 950–1013) was the son of Reginar III who died in exile in Bohemia in 973. Lambert I of Leuven was his brother.

History
His father Reginar III was exiled in 958 as a rebel, by Otto I, Holy Roman Emperor. Hainaut was held after then by Godfrey I, Duke of Lower Lorraine, but Reginar IV claimed that Mons in Hainaut had been his father's.

He attacked Mons in 973, after the death of Duke Godfrey, but did not manage to hold it, because Godfrey I, Count of Verdun then held it until he died. He managed to replace Godfrey as Count of Mons in 998.

Family
Regnier IV married Hedwig, daughter of Hugh Capet and Adelaide of Poitou.

They had  children:

 Reginar V, Count of Mons, married Mathilde of Verdun, daughter of Herman, Count of Verdun.
 Lambert of Mons
 Beatrix, who married Ebles I, Count of Rheims and Roucy and Archbishop of Rheims.
 Ermentrude, died at the age of two or three; buried in the Collegiate Church of Saint Gertrude in Nivelles, Belgium. The burial came to light during an excavation. A lead cross, inscribed with her name and that of her parents, was found in the tomb.

950s births
1013 deaths
House of Reginar
Counts of Mons
Margraves of Valenciennes